Dashawn Maurice Robertson (August 1, 2000 – May 31, 2021), known professionally as Lil Loaded, was an American rapper from Dallas, Texas. He rose to fame in mid-2019 after his song "6locc 6a6y" went viral.

Early life
Robertson was born in San Bernardino, California, and raised in Dallas, Texas. When asked what it was like growing up in Dallas, he said: "It's like everywhere in the city, you see different stuff, I guess you kind of grow up a little bit faster I would say in Dallas". He grew up with five siblings, an older brother, 
two older sisters, a younger sister, and a younger brother and was raised by a single mom while his dad was in prison. In 2015, when Robertson was 15, his older brother who was 23 at the time was murdered. He was affiliated with the Rollin' 60s Neighborhood Crips.

Career
Robertson started rapping in late 2018. His first song was "B.O.S.", a take on YNW Melly's song "Butter Pecan". He rose to prominence in 2019 when YouTuber Tommy Craze included his song "6locc 6a6y" in a reaction video in which he watched YouTube music videos that had 0 views. "6locc 6a6y" was certified gold in May 2021, by which point it had received over 28million views on YouTube. Robertson later released "Gang Unit", which had garnered more than 59million YouTube views by May 2022.

Robertson later signed with Epic Records. He released his 6locc 6a6y mixtape in 2019, and returned in 2020 with A Demon in 6lue and Criptape.

On May 31, 2022, Robertson's team posthumously released "Cell Tales" on the first anniversary of his death.

Legal issues 
On October 25, 2020, Robertson allegedly shot and killed a friend, 18-year-old Khalil Walker, while recording a music video. Robertson turned himself in to police on November 9, 2020, after a warrant was issued for his arrest. He was indicted on a lesser charge of manslaughter in connection with the incident in February 2021. Robertson maintained that the incident was an accident.

Death
Robertson died, apparently by suicide via gunshot wound to the head, on May 31, 2021, at the age of 20. He was found dead by his mother who then called the police. When police arrived, they saw his mother outside of the home crying and she told them Robertson was inside the house with a gunshot wound to the head. She claimed he had been upset over a breakup with his girlfriend the night before.

Discography

Studio albums

Mixtapes

Singles

References

2000 births
2021 deaths
2021 suicides
21st-century American male musicians
21st-century American rappers
African-American male rappers
Epic Records artists
Rappers from California
Suicides by firearm in Texas
21st-century African-American musicians
Musicians from San Bernardino, California